This is the episode list of , a Japanese tokusatsu television series produced by Tsuburaya Productions as part of the long-running Ultraman series. The series premiered on TV Tokyo on July 6, 2019.

Episodes



References

Sources

External links
Episode List on Ultraman Taiga

Taiga